The Ākitio River is in the North Island of New Zealand.

In July 2020, the name of the river was officially gazetted as Ākitio River by the New Zealand Geographic Board.

Cyclone Gabrielle caused the mouth of the river to move.

References

Rivers of Manawatū-Whanganui